Gert Aandewiel (born 9 September 1969 in Leiden) is a Dutch football manager and former football player.

Club career
He played professional football for FC Volendam (1996-1997), Sparta Rotterdam (1997-1999) and FC Dordrecht (1999).

Managerial career
After winning two amateur championships and the Amateur Coach of the Year trophy with Quick Boys, Aandewiel became manager of Haarlem in 2005. On 8 February 2007, when working as a coach for HFC Haarlem, he was named as the new manager of Sparta Rotterdam to replace Wiljan Vloet at the end of the 2006-2007 season. He was sacked by Sparta Rotterdam on 11 November 2007. He joined NAC and became joint caretaker-manager, then assistant to John Karelse.

In April 2012 Aandewiel announced he would become Armenia's FC Banants' youth development manager. In March 2014, Aandewiel revealed he would leave FC Oss in the summer after only a half year at the helm. In October 2014, Aandewiel was named technical manager of Dutch Hoofdklasse side Quick Boys.

References

External links
  Profile

1969 births
Living people
Footballers from Leiden
Association football midfielders
Dutch footballers
Dutch football managers
FC Volendam players
Sparta Rotterdam players
FC Dordrecht players
HFC Haarlem managers
Sparta Rotterdam managers
NAC Breda managers
TOP Oss managers
Rinus Michels Award winners